C&A was a Belgian professional cycling team that existed in 1978. The team was formed after the Fiat France team ended the previous season. It was sponsored by Dutch clothing retailer C&A, who only came into the sport to sponsor a team that had Eddy Merckx on its roster. Merckx, who had ridden with Fiat France, was at the end of his career and he quit the team in March 1978.

Team roster
The following is a list of riders on the C&A squad during the 1978 season, with age given for 1 January 1978.

References

Cycling teams based in Belgium
Defunct cycling teams based in Belgium
1978 establishments in Belgium
1978 disestablishments in Belgium
Cycling teams established in 1978
Cycling teams disestablished in 1978